Richard Francis Onslow (16 January 1776 – 23 October 1849 ) was Archdeacon of Worcester from 1815 to 1849.

Onslow was the son of Arthur Onslow, Dean of Worcester 1795–1817. He was educated at Christ Church, Oxford and ordained in 1800. He was Domestic Chaplain to the Bishop of Worcester; and then Vicar of Kidderminster until 1834. His final post was as Rector  of Newent: in 1848 he fell ill and was "no longer able to preach".

His wife Harriet, the daughter of Andrew Foley, survived him and died in 1860; and his last surviving child, also called Harriet, died in 1879.

References

1776 births
1849 deaths
Alumni of Christ Church, Oxford
Archdeacons of Worcester